The Cîțu Cabinet was the 131st government of Romania, led by the national liberal (PNL) Prime Minister Florin Cîțu. It was removed from office after a motion of no confidence passed by the Parliament with a record of 281 votes, the largest number of votes on a motion of no confidence since the Romanian Revolution.

Formation of the government and negotiations

Procedure 
The prime minister candidate, who is designated by the president, has to request the investiture vote/vote of confidence from the legislature within 10 days from being appointed.

Consultations with the president 

On 6 December 2020, elections for a new Romanian Parliament took place. On 10 December 2020, the incumbent President of Romania, Klaus Iohannis, invited all the parties that acceded into the newly elected Parliament, more specifically PSD, PNL, USR-PLUS, AUR, and UDMR/RMDSZ as well as the representatives of the national minorities for consultations at Cotroceni Palace on 14 December 2020.

Political negotiations 

On 7 December 2020, the leader of the UDMR/RMDSZ senators of the 2016–2020 legislature of the Romanian Parliament, Attila Cseke stated that Hunor Kelemen, the current president of the party, had talked to Klaus Iohannis and that they were awaiting for the finalisation of the count of the election votes.

On 9 December 2020, EPP MEP from the PNL, Rareș Bogdan, was confident the government would be approved by 23 December, and that the cabinet would have between 16 and 18 ministries.

The National Liberal Party (PNL), USR-PLUS, and the Democratic Alliance of Hungarians in Romania (UDMR/RMDSZ) had met at Vila Lac 1 on 12 December 2020 to negotiate on making up the coalition government proposition and on several key aspects: the collaboration in the parliament, the government positions, and the governance programme. The UDMR were not prepared, nor willing to take any key function within the newly elected parliament.

On 12 December 2020, political negotiations had reached a stalemate, since the liberals wanted Ludovic Orban to preside over the Chamber of Deputies, while USR-PLUS wanted Dan Barna to become its president. On 15 December 2020, Dan Barna announced his desire for Cătălin Drulă to become the president of the Chamber of Deputies on behalf of USR PLUS, which angered Ludovic Orban.

Vote in the parliament 
After the president proposed Florin Cîțu to the position of Prime Minister on 22 December, the proposed government was subsequently also brought to the parliament for the voting procedure on 23 December. All minister propositions had passed the hearings in the parliamentary commissions on the same day. It was approved by the parliament, with 260 votes in favour and 183 votes against giving the Cîțu Cabinet confidence, more than the minimum 228 necessary votes.

Fall of the government 

The government was threatened as of result of the passing of the "National Anghel Saligny Investment Plan" (or PNDL 3) and of the ousting of Justice Minister Stelian Ion. On 3 September 2021, member of the coalition government, USR PLUS alongside opposition party AUR lodged a vote of no confidence against Florin Cîțu and his government entitled "The dismissal of the Cîțu Government, Romania's only chance to live!". All ministers originating from USR PLUS resigned from their positions on 7 September 2021.

On 4 October 2021, a day before the motion of no confidence, the Cîțu Cabinet had approved a multitude of government emergency ordinances (O.U.G.) and government decisions (H.G.).

The cabinet continued to function as a PNL-UDMR/RMDSZ minority government until 5 October 2021, when it was dissolved by a motion of no confidence entitled "Stop poverty, price increases and criminals! Down with the Cîțu Government!" submitted by the Social Democratic Party (PSD), with 281 votes "for" adoption, and a lack of abstentions and "against" votes. Out of a total of 466 members of parliament, only 318 showed up. On the day of the motion, social democratic members of parliament brought a Superman hanging upside down, in a pool of blood - alluding to a social media post made by Florin Cîțu with the superhero. Deputy president of the PNL, Alina Gorghiu, reacted to the prop, saying it was a call to violence on Facebook. Until the next cabinet was voted in the Parliament, the Cîțu cabinet continued on as an acting/ad interim government. It is the sixth post-revolutionary government in the recent history of Romania to be ousted through a motion of no confidence.

Romanian President Klaus Iohannis reacted to the result of the vote by saying that the word "crisis" describes "present-day Romania" the best. Negotiations and talks with the president on forming the government to replace the Cîțu Cabinet are expected to start a week after the fall of the government led by Florin Cîțu.

Reuters journalist Radu Marinas considers that the most likely outcome for the next government is a restored PNL-USR-UDMR/RMDSZ coalition, having a Prime Minister other than Florin Cîțu, since an early election would be unlikely, due to it requiring the Parliament of Romania two prime minister proposals from the President of Romania in a time period of 60 days. Nonetheless, the PNL began negotiations with the major opposition Social Democratic Party (PSD) for a new coalition together with the UDMR, which were closed on 21 November 2021, with the next cabinet, the Ciucă Cabinet, being sworn in on 25 November.

Composition

Party breakdown 

Party breakdown of cabinet ministers:

Formation 

 National Liberal Party 
 Save Romania Union 
 Democratic Alliance of Hungarians in Romania 
 Freedom, Unity and Solidarity Party 
 Independent

End term 

 National Liberal Party (PNL) 
 Democratic Alliance of Hungarians in Romania (UDMR/RMDSZ) 
 Independent

Notes

References 

Government of Romania
2020 establishments in Romania
Cabinets established in 2020
2020 in Romania
2021 in Romania
Cabinets disestablished in 2021
2021 disestablishments in Romania